The Order of Attorneys of Portugal, also known as the Portuguese Bar Association, is the public association to which all attorneys-at-law belong in Portugal, founded in 1926. Its early origins are found on a private association founded in 1838 by a group of lawyers from Lisbon.

Graduates in law from university who wish to act on behalf of clients before a court of law must register at the Portuguese Bar Association. Only those who are duly registered can provide legal consultation and appear before the court. Other graduates in law may choose other jobs, which do not demand registration at the bar association.

Being a public association, it is independent from the government, but it has some public powers, which include disciplinary action over its members. Its decisions are subject to judicial impeachment. In Portuguese law, an attorney-at-law is known as advogado. His job equals that of both solicitors and barristers (although Portugal also has a separate profession of solicitor, or solicitador).

The internship for a Portuguese recently graduated Lawyer to become full member of the Bar, includes a complex week-long exam at first, three day long pre-exams on a Monday, Wednesday and Friday, then a usually unpaid, though sometimes paid, internship of eighteen months and finally, a last exam for a whole day. However, after this exam, the intern is also subject to an oral exam which is again, mandatory.

References

External links
 Legal profession - Portugal, European Commission
 Portugal: Legal description, The American Bar website, Forster-Long, Inc.
 Ordem dos Advogados official website 

Professional associations based in Portugal
Law of Portugal
Bar associations of Europe
Organizations established in 1926
1926 establishments in Portugal